Cream Stew (くりぃむしちゅー) is the name of a Japanese comedy kombi consisting of two comedians, Shinya Ueda (上田晋也) and Teppei Arita (有田哲平). Originally from Kumamoto city, the pair first met in high school when Arita and Ueda found a common interest in pro wrestling. Both of them attended Waseda and Rikkyo Universities, but dropped out to pursue comedy.

More than 15 years later, Ueda and Arita are popular personalities on Japanese television, and can be seen performing daily, often on multiple shows in one day, sometimes on different channels simultaneously.

As with many Japanese kombi, one of the comedians is referred to as the boke, and the other the tsukkomi. As the boke, Arita is loud and prone to strange comments, while Ueda (sometimes called tempa, see note) is the more reasonable of the two, often criticizing Arita's remarks while setting up further jokes and often providing Arita with a one-man audience (even when nobody else is laughing). Ueda also distinguishes himself from most tsukkomi as the king of unchiku (うんちく), or the ability to lecture on about something that the speaker's audience really has no interest in whatsoever.

Now showing
Cream Stew are currently listed as regulars on the following programs:
くりぃむナントカ (Cream Something, Kuriimu Nantoka) on TV Asahi
痛快!明石家電視台 (Akashiya TV) on MBS
ドリームビジョン (Dream Vision) on Nippon TV
ズバリ言うわよ! (I'm gonna say it straight!, Zubari iu wa yo!) on TBS
知ってみて得するバラエティ シルシルミシル (The Variety Show to Know, Watch and be useful Shirushiru Mishiru) on TV Asahi
タカトシ×くりぃむのペケ×ポン (Takatoshi×Cream's Pekepon) on Fuji TV
銭形金太郎 (Zenigata Kintarō) on TV Asahi 　
世界一受けたい授業 (The most useful class in the world, Sekai Ichi Uketai Jugyō) on Nippon TV 　
おしゃれイズム (Style-ism, Oshare-izumu) on Nippon TV (Ueda)
しゃべくり007 (Seven men who like talking, Shabekuri-seven) on Nippon TV
キャッシュキャブ (Cash Cab) on Fuji TV
くりぃむクイズ ミラクル9 (Cream Quiz Miracle 9) on TV Asahi

See also

Owarai

Notes
天パ (tempa, from the word-phrase 天然パーマ, ten'nen paama, meaning 'natural perm') is a nickname given to many Japanese (usually males) who are born with naturally curly hair.

References

External links
Cream Stew Official Website
Cream Stew Information

Japanese comedy duos
People from Kumamoto
Living people
Year of birth missing (living people)